Kata-vari is a dialect of the Kamkata-vari language spoken by the Kata in parts of Afghanistan and Pakistan. The most used alternative names are Kati, Kativiri or Bashgali.

It is spoken by approximately 40,000 people (mostly in Afghanistan, just over 3,700 in Pakistan), and its speakers are Muslim. Literacy rates are low: below 1% for people who have it as a first language, and between 15% to 25% for people who have it as a second language.

There are two main sub-dialects: Eastern Kata-vari and Western Kata-vari. In Afghanistan, Western Kata-vari is spoken in the Ramgal, Kulam, Ktivi and Paruk valleys of Nuristan. Eastern Kata-vari is spoken in the upper Landai Sin Valley. In Pakistan, Eastern Kata-vari or Shekhani is spoken in Chitral District, in Gobor and the upper Bumboret Valley.

Phonology

Consonants 

 Sounds /ʒ ɽ ɣ/ occur from neighboring languages. /f x/ are borrowed from loanwords.
/ʈ/ can also be heard as an allophone [ɽ].
 [j] is heard as an allophone of /i/.
 /v/ can also be heard as bilabial [β] or a labial approximant [w].

Vowels 

 Mid /ə/ can be heard as a close central [ɨ].

Vocabulary 
Pronouns:

1sg. uze (nominative), ie (accusative), iema (genitive)

1pl. imu (nominative/accusative/genitive)

2sg. tiu (nominative), tu (accusative), tuma (genitive)

2pl. šo (nominative/accusative/genitive)

Numbers:

1: ev

2: diu

3: tre

4: štavo

5: puč

6: ṣu

7: sut

8: uṣṭ

9: nu

10: duć

References

External links 
 
 
 
 
 

Nuristani languages of Afghanistan
Languages of Afghanistan
Languages of Khyber Pakhtunkhwa
Languages of Chitral
Nuristani languages